Komnena Nemanjić (fl. 1208–1215) was the Duchess consort of Dimitri Progoni, the albanian megas archon of Kruja, and later Gregory Kamonas, the archon of Elbasan. She was the daughter of Serbian King Stephen II Nemanjić (r. 1196–1228).

Life
Komnena was born to King Stephen II and his wife Eudokia Angelina, and was thus a granddaughter of Emperor Alexios III Angelos. She had three brothers: Stephen Radoslav (r. 1228–1233), Stephen Vladislav I (r. 1233–1243) and Predislav (the third Serbian Archbishop as Saint Sava II, after uncle Sava).

She married Dimitri in 1208, and a brief alliance was formed between Serbia and Arbanon amidst conflicts with the Republic of Venice. After Dimitrii died in 1215, the power was left to Komnena, who shortly afterwards married Greco-Albanian lord Gregory Kamonas. He assumed control over Kruja, strengthening relations with Serbia, which had been weakened after a Serbian assault on Shkodër.

She had a daughter with Gregorios who married Golem of Kruja.

References

Sources
Skenderbeg, Makedonci i akademik Kaplan Burović
The New Cambridge Medieval History: c. 1198-c. 1300, p. 786
The despotate of Epiros

Nemanjić dynasty
13th-century Serbian royalty
Medieval Serbian princesses
Serbs in Albania
13th-century Albanian people
People from Elbasan
Medieval Serbian people of Greek descent
13th-century Eastern Orthodox Christians
13th-century women